HMS Forward was a 12-gun gun-brig of the Archer class of the British Royal Navy.

History
In December 1804 Lieutenant Daniel Shiels commissioned Forward for the Channel.

On 7 February 1806 Forward was some six or seven leagues off Dunnose, Isle of Wight when she sighted and gave chase to a French privateer lugger. After a chase of half-an-hour and some firing, the lugger struck. She was Rancune, Captain Foliot, of Cherbourg and 12 hours out of there, having taken nothing. She was pierced for 12 guns but had only four mounted; she also carried swivel guns and small arms. Two of her crew had been wounded, one dangerously.

On 17 April 1807 forward, Lieutenant Shiels, captured the Danish ship Sylt.

In 1807 Lieutenant Richard Welsh replaced Shiels, but then in 1808 Shiels returned to command.

Despite coming under artillery and musket fire from a fortification, the British successfully spirited away the vessels, with five men wounded in the action.

On 2 July 1809, Forward, Lieutenant Shiels, captured the Danish fishing vessel De Hoop.

On 26 September 1809, Forward captured Jomfrue Sinneve Christiene, L.F. Grave, master.

On 1 October, Forward captured Elizabeth, Hans Olsen, master.

On 5 October Forward captured Stadt Odense, S. Pederson, master.

Circa May 1810, Lieutenant Richard Bankes transferred from the hired armed cutter Duke of York to Forward, on the Leith station.

On 19 November 1811 Forward, commanded by Bankes, captured the merchant vessel Fortuna.

During the War of 1812, Forward was present off the Gulf Coast. Forward and a transport were the last remaining vessels in the vicinity of the British post at Prospect Bluff. On 16 May they evacuated the last of the garrison there. Edward Nicolls, Woodbine, and the Redstick Creek leader Josiah Francis, arrived at Amelia Island, in East Florida on 7 June 1815, where rumours circulated that the officers were seeking either to obtain British possession of Florida from Spain, or at least to arm and supply the Florida factions resisting American territorial expansion. (In fact, Nicolls had been heading to the Bahamas, and had unintentionally ended up in Florida.) Forward arrived in Bermuda, and disembarked her passengers on 28 June. Edward Nicolls embarked on the Forward on 29 June 'for passage to England', and disembarked at Portsmouth on 13 September 1815.

Fate
The "Principal Officers and Commissioners of His Majesty's Navy" offered the "Gun-brig Forward, of 179 tons", "lying at Woolwich" for sale on 14 December 1815. Forward'' was sold on that day for £600 for breaking up.

Notes

Citations

References
 
 William James (naval historian) (1826). The Naval History of Great Britain, Volume V, 1808 – 1811.

Brigs of the Royal Navy
1805 ships
Ships built in England
War of 1812 ships of the United Kingdom